A Brilliant Monster is a 2018 American thriller/horror film written and directed by F.C.Rabbath. The film stars Dennis Friebe, Joy Kigin, David Raizor, Nick Leali, Aléa Figueroa, Bill Kelly, Bryan Perritt, Dina Najjar, and Mark A. Marple.

Plot 
Mitch Stockridge, a self-help author has unorthodox ways of getting his story ideas. The cost of success may cost your humanity but maybe Mitch is willing to pay it.

Cast and crew 
 Dennis Friebe as Mitch Stockridge
 Joy Kigin as Abby Dunn
 David Raizor as Carver
 Nick Leali as Nick
 Aléa Figueroa as Sophie
 Dina Najjar as Laura
 Gleb Krotov as Young Mitch
 Bryan Perritt as TV Host
 Assistant Director Kayla King
 Second Assistant Director Jeremy King
 Consulting Producers Tatiana Warden and Stephen Smith

Release 
World Premiering its theatrical release at the Dances With Films film festival June 16, 2018 at the Grauman's Chinese Theatre.

Gravitas Ventures distributed the film theatrically and home video in May 2019.

Critical reception 
Dread Central "A Brilliant Monster could very well be one of the strongest films to come out of the indie horror scene in 2017 so far,"

Rotten Tomatoes the film holds 100% based on 5 reviews.

Critic's Dens states the film "invokes Hitchcock with a Hint of Henenlotter."

Starburst "bold and surprisingly slick production".

References

External links 
 
 

2018 horror thriller films